Ryan Solle (born September 11, 1985 in Sanford, North Carolina) is an American soccer player, currently without a club.

Career

College
Solle grew up in Broadway, North Carolina, played club soccer for the Fayetteville Force with whom he won three consecutive North Carolina state championships (1999, 2000 and 2001), and attended Lee County High School in Sanford, North Carolina, where he was selected as a 2003 Parade Magazine High School All American. He played college soccer Wake Forest University from 2003 to 2006, and finished second on the Wake Forest career assist list with twenty-seven in fifty games.

During his college years Solle also played in the USL Premier Development League for both Raleigh CASL Elite and Carolina Dynamo.

Professional
Solle was drafted in the second round (25th overall) of the 2007 MLS SuperDraft by New England Revolution, but never played a first team game with the team and was released on August 31, 2007. In the spring of 2008, he signed with the Carolina RailHawks of the USL First Division, and played his first professional game in a 1–1 tie with the Atlanta Silverbacks.

In 2009 Solle moved to play with the Wilmington Hammerheads of the USL Second Division.

International
Solle played a single game with the U.S. U-18 team in 2003. In February 2007, he joined the United States under-23 men's national soccer team for a tour of Japan.

Honors

Wilmington Hammerheads
USL Second Division Regular Season Champions (1): 2009

References

External links
 Wilmington Hammerheads bio
 Wake Forest bio

1985 births
Living people
American soccer players
North Carolina Fusion U23 players
North Carolina FC players
New England Revolution players
Parade High School All-Americans (boys' soccer)
North Carolina FC U23 players
USL League Two players
USL First Division players
USL Second Division players
Wake Forest Demon Deacons men's soccer players
Wilmington Hammerheads FC players
New England Revolution draft picks
Soccer players from North Carolina
People from Sanford, North Carolina
Association football midfielders